Wilsonville is a city primarily in Clackamas County, Oregon, United States. A portion of the northern section of the city is in Washington County. It was founded as Boones Landing because of the Boones Ferry which crossed the Willamette River at the location; the community became Wilsonville in 1880. The city was incorporated in 1969 with a population of approximately 1,000. The population was 13,991 at the 2000 census, and grew to 19,509 as of 2010.  Slightly more than 90% of residents at the 2000 census were white, with Hispanics comprising the largest minority group.

Located within the Portland metropolitan area, the city also includes the planned communities of Charbonneau on the south side of the river, and Villebois on the western edge. The city is bisected by Interstate 5 and includes I-5's Boone Bridge over the Willamette. Public transportation is provided by the city-owned South Metro Area Regional Transit, which connects to the Portland-based TriMet by train through TriMet's WES and by bus at the Tualatin Park & Ride. Students in public schools attend schools in the West Linn-Wilsonville and Canby school districts, including the only traditional high school, Wilsonville High School. Clackamas Community College and Oregon Tech have satellite campuses in the city.

Wilsonville has a council-manager form of government and operates its own library, public works, and parks & recreation department. Fire and police protection are contracted out to other regional government agencies. Wilsonville Public Works contracts Jacobs for operation of the wastewater treatment plant, and Veolia North America for operation of the Willamette River Water Treatment Plant. The city is home to several technology companies including Mentor Graphics, along with Stream Global Services, the largest employer in the city. Wilsonville contains many distribution and manufacturing buildings adjacent to Interstate 5 such as regional distribution facilities for Coca-Cola and Rite Aid. Retail centers include Argyle Square on the north and the Town Center Shopping Center to the south. Media in Wilsonville consists of the Portland area broadcast stations, regional newspapers, and the local Wilsonville Spokesman newspaper.

History
Alphonso Boone, the grandson of Daniel Boone, settled in what would later become Wilsonville in 1846 and established the Boones Ferry across the Willamette River in 1847. The ferry gave rise to the community of Boones Landing, which eventually grew into Wilsonville. Originally, the area was part of what became Yamhill County, but was transferred to the current Clackamas County in 1855. The first post office was established in 1876 with the name Boones Ferry.

Wilsonville became the name of the community on June 3, 1880, named after the first postmaster, Charles Wilson. That same year the first school, Wilsonville Grade School, was opened as a single-room building. By 1890, the railroad had reached town and the community contained depot, several hotels, a saloon, a tavern, a bank, and several other commercial establishments. In 1897, the twelve school districts in the vicinity of Wilsonville up to Lake Oswego merged to create a single district. A railroad bridge was built across the river for the Oregon Electric Railway beginning in 1906. The bridge was completed the next year and service from Wilsonville south to Salem began in 1908.

A new Methodist church was built in the community in 1910, which was used until 1988 and is still standing. Two years later, a new two-room school replaced the old one-room school, which in turn was replaced by a modern school in the mid 1900s, all on the same property. In 1939, the wooden trestle part of the railroad bridge across the Willamette caught fire and burned. Boones Ferry was decommissioned after the Boone Bridge opened in 1954 carrying what was then the Baldock Freeway, and is today Interstate 5.

In 1961, the Dammasch State Hospital mental hospital opened on the west side of the community. Gordon House, the only house in Oregon to be designed by architect Frank Lloyd Wright, was built in 1963 near what became Charbonneau and moved to the Oregon Garden in 2001. Wilsonville was flooded in 1964 and the first fire station was built in 1966. Wilsonville was incorporated as a city on October 10, 1968, with a population of about 1,000. In 1971, the planned community of Charbonneau on the south side of the river was annexed into the city the year after development began.

Tektronix built a campus in the city beginning in 1973, which was later sold to Xerox. The following year Wilsonville's city hall relocated from Tauchman House at what is now Boones Ferry Park to a trailer and the next year the first city manager was hired. A standalone post office was built in 1976 at Boones Ferry and Wilsonville roads, with city police protection added in 1979. In 1980, the city reached a population of 2,920, and in 1982 the library was opened. The next year, a new city hall was opened, replacing a trailer that had served as city hall since 1975.

In 1988, the city opened their first library building, which replaced the one-room library located in space leased from the school district. The population grew to 7,106 at the 1990 census, and in 1991 the Town Center Shopping Center along Wilsonville Road opened. Due to growth in the West Linn-Wilsonville School District, the school board approved building a new high school to be located in Wilsonville in 1992.

Author Walt Morey owned an estate in Wilsonville and after his death in 1992, his widow sold the property to a developer. The housing development built on that property, Morey's Landing, bears his name as does the children's section of the Wilsonville Public Library. Walt Morey Park, a bear-themed park located in Morey's Landing, contains a life-size 8-foot-tall wooden statue of Morey's most famous literary creation, Gentle Ben.

Living Enrichment Center, a New Thought Church with as many as 3,000 members, was headquartered in Wilsonville from 1992 until 2004. The church closed that year after problems that including money laundering by the church leaders led to the bankrupting of the church.

In 1995, Dammasch State Hospital was closed by the state of Oregon, and the site was then proposed as a location for what became the Coffee Creek Correctional Facility, which opened in 2001 at a different site to the north of the old hospital grounds. In protest of the construction of the prison, specifically the effect on property values, Larry Eaton began erecting school buses on his property. The former grounds of the state hospital have been redeveloped as Villebois, a primarily residential planned community. Also in 1995, Wilsonville High School opened as part of the West Linn-Wilsonville School District, the first high school in the city's history. In 1998, lack of an adequate long-term water supply forced the city to suspend adding any new developments to the city. A new water treatment plant on the Willamette River opened in 2002 to address this need.

The Wilsonville Public Library was expanded to nearly four times the size of the  1988 building with an expansion finished in 2002. Wilsonville Primary School was closed in June 2001, and later sold with the property and turned into a shopping center, anchored by an Albertsons supermarket. In September 2006, Wilsonville opened a new $9.9 million, two-story brick and steel city hall after a controversy concerning its location led to unsuccessful attempts to recall several elected officials in the city, including the mayor. In 2007, the old city hall building was turned into a new public works and police department.

Geography

Primarily in the southwestern part of Clackamas County, the northern section is in Washington County. It is located on the north side of the Willamette River around where Alphonse Boone established the Boones Ferry. Neighboring cities are Tualatin on the north, Sherwood to the northwest, and Canby and Aurora to the southeast. Newberg in Yamhill County is approximately 14 miles west along Wilsonville Road. The Willamette separates the majority of the city from Charbonneau, a planned community and neighborhood within the city limits, on the south.

Waterways in addition to the Willamette River include Arrowhead Creek, Meridian Creek, Basalt Creek, Seely Ditch, Boeckman Creek, and Coffee Lake Creek. The Boeckman and Coffee Lake creeks account for 85% of the runoff in Wilsonville. Coffee Lake Creek is on the west side of the city and includes Coffee Lake and the Coffee Lake Wetlands. The foothills of the Chehalem Mountains lie to the west of Wilsonville, with most land within the city on level ground.

Wilsonville divides the city into 16 neighborhood groups, designated A through P. Within each of these planning areas are individual neighborhoods, and occasionally a neighborhood spans several of these groups. For instance the Villebois development covers areas D through G. Individual neighborhoods include Charbonneau, Wilsonville Meadows, Canyon Creek North, Town Center, RiverGreen, Frog Pond, and Old Town to name a few. Wilsonville's Old Town neighborhood, the oldest of the neighborhoods, is located south of Wilsonville Road along Boones Ferry Road adjacent to the landing of the old Boones Ferry and contains the original portions of the town.

Climate
Wilsonville, as part of the Willamette Valley is within the Marine west coast climate zone. Summers in Wilsonville are generally warm, but temperatures year-round are moderated by a marine influence from the Pacific Ocean. Wilsonville receives most of its precipitation during the mild to cool winter months, with the wettest period from November through March. The highest recorded temperature, occurred June 28th, 2021, during a record breaking heatwave throughout the Pacific Northwest.

Demographics

The city has a significant population of families that use Wilsonville as a halfway point between jobs in different cities, mainly Salem and Portland. Wilsonville incorporated with an estimated 1,000 residents in 1969 and grew to 2,920 people at the 1980 Census, and to 7,106 in 1990. In 2000, the census placed the population at 13,991, which rose to 19,509 in 2010.  Of those counted, approximately 1,500 are inmates at the Coffee Creek Correctional Facility that opened in the city in 2001.

2020 census 
As of the census of 2020, there were 25,492 people, 9,750 households, and 5,374 families residing in the city. The population density was 3,319.2 inhabitants per square mile (1,326.3/km2). There were 10,213 housing units at an average density of 1,321.8 (531.3/km2). The racial makeup of the city was 83.8% White, 1.9% African American, 1.0% Native American, 4.7% Asian, 1.0% Pacific Islander, 2.0% from other races, and 5.6% from two or more races. Hispanic or Latino of any race were 11.7% of the population.

2010 census
As of the census of 2010, there were 19,509 people, 7,859 households, and 4,658 families residing in the city. The racial makeup of the city was 85.3% White, 1.5% African American, 1.0% Native American, 3.8% Asian, 0.4% Pacific Islander, 4.8% from other races, and 3.2% from two or more races. Hispanic or Latino of any race were 12.1% of the population.

There were 7,859 households, of which 29.9% had children under the age of 18 living with them, 45.3% were married couples living together, 10.0% had a female householder with no husband present, 4.0% had a male householder with no wife present, and 40.7% were non-families. 32.9% of all households were made up of individuals, and 11.8% had someone living alone who was 65 years of age or older. The average household size was 2.28 and the average family size was 2.93.

The median age in the city was 36.2 years. 22% of residents were under the age of 18; 8.8% were between the ages of 18 and 24; 32.2% were from 25 to 44; 23.8% were from 45 to 64; and 13.3% were 65 years of age or older. The gender makeup of the city was 46.6% male and 53.4% female.

2000 census
As of the census of 2000, there were 13,991 people, 5,937 households, and 3,775 families residing in the city.  The population density was 2,085.3 people per square mile (805.1/km).  There were 6,407 housing units at an average density of 954.9 per square mile (368.7/km).  The racial makeup of the city was 90.5% White, 2.2% Asian, 0.7% African American, 0.7% Native American, 0.2% Pacific Islander, 3.2% from other races, and 2.7% from two or more races. Hispanic or Latino of any race were 6.9% of the population.

There were 5,937 households, out of which 30.4% had children under the age of 18 living with them, 51.5% were married couples living together, 8.3% had a female householder with no husband present, and 36.4% were non-families. 28.3% of all households were made up of individuals, and 9.7% had someone living alone who was 65 years of age or older.  The average household size was 2.34 and the average family size was 2.89.  Median home cost was $200,972 in 2000 and had grown to $316,400 by 2006.

In the city, the population was spread out, with 24.6% under the age of 18, 9.4% from 18 to 24, 31.4% from 25 to 44, 20.2% from 45 to 64, and 14.4% who were 65 years of age or older.  The median age was 35 years. For every 100 females, there were 94.5 males.  For every 100 females age 18 and over, there were 91.7 males.

The median income for a household in the city was $52,515, and the median income for a family was $65,172. This income level is higher than the county, state, and national median income levels. Males had a median income of $43,480 versus $28,395 for females. The per capita income for the city was $29,786.  About 3.0% of families and 5.6% of the population were below the poverty line, including 3.7% of those under age 18 and 8.2% of those age 65 or over.

Economy
Wilsonville has often had more jobs in the city than residents due to its location along Interstate 5. This location has led to the city becoming headquarters for several major local and national companies, as well as home to facilities of several national companies. Companies with their headquarters in the city include design software maker Mentor Graphics; imaging systems manufacturer FLIR Systems; and shoe retailer Solestruck. G.I. Joe's, a sporting goods and automotive parts retailer was based in Wilsonville until bankruptcy in 2009, as was drugstore chain Thrifty PayLess until it was bought by Rite Aid in 1996, and video rental retailer Movie Gallery and its subsidiary Hollywood Video were as well until bankruptcy in 2010.

Copier and printer manufacturer Xerox operates a large facility in Wilsonville, and is the city's largest employer.  The company acquired the color printing and imaging division of Tektronix corporation in 2000. Xerox, Mentor Graphics, and FLIR are all adjacent to each other north of Boeckman Road along Parkway Avenue. Projector maker InFocus was headquartered in the city until December 2009 and was located next to FLIR. InFocus and Mentor were both founded by former employees of Tektronix.

Wilsonville is home to many other business located in industrial parks straddling Interstate 5 that are filled with manufacturing and distribution facilities. Xerox and Mentor Graphics are the city's two largest employers as of 2006, the only two to employ more than 1000 people. Other large employers in the city are Tyco Electronics (Precision Interconnect), Sysco, Rockwell Collins, and Rite Aid. Additionally, Coca-Cola operates a bottling plant in the city. Nike had one of its U.S. distribution centers for footwear in Wilsonville until closing it in 2009.

Retail in Wilsonville is concentrated mainly along Wilsonville Road near the Interstate 5 interchange. This includes the Town Center Shopping Center and related developments along Town Center Loop, which included Fry's Electronics, one of the former largest employers in the city, which closed in 2021. Fred Meyer opened a  store along with space for 20 other businesses at their Old Town Square where Boones Ferry and Wilsonville roads meet. At the north end of town is the  Argyle Square shopping center that opened in 2003, which includes a Target store, Office Depot, and Costco as anchor tenants. South of the Willamette River, Charbonneau has a small commercial center with about 10 shops.

Microsoft had a plant, producing the Surface Hub, from 2015 to mid-2017, with the loss of 124 jobs.

Cornwell Woodburn and Wilsonville Funeral Chapels was founded in 1933 by J. Melvin Ringo in Woodburn. The business moved to 2nd and Garfield, where it was expanded.  Charles Cornwell, Melvin's son-in-law, joined the business after WWII and ran it together with his wife Lou Jane for 60 years. In 1995, a new chapel in Wilsonville was completed, making it the first new funeral home in the state of Oregon in over 20 years.

Culture
Media in Wilsonville consists of the 28 radio stations and 7 television stations broadcast in the Portland media market, regional newspapers such as The Oregonian, and the local paper, the Wilsonville Spokesman. The Spokesman is published once a week on Wednesdays and has a circulation of 3,176. There is a single movie theater operated by Regal Cinemas, which contains nine screens. The theater opened in 1996 and featured the first stadium style seating in the Northwest.

Wilsonville Public Library, founded in 1982, is a member of Library Information Network of Clackamas County and had an annual circulation of 493,000 in 2006 to 2007. The library is located adjacent to Wilsonville Memorial Park, the largest and oldest of the city's 12 parks. Memorial Park includes a water feature, athletic fields, and the Stein-Boozier Barn used as meeting space, among other amenities. Town Center Park also has a water feature along with a visitor's center operated by the Clackamas County and the Oregon Korean War Memorial. Other parks in the city are River Fox Park, Park at Merryfield, Montebello Park, Hathaway Park, Courtside Park, Tranquil Park, Willamette River Water Treatment Plant Park, Willow Creek/Landover Park, Canyon Creek Park, and Boones Ferry Park located on the Willamette River at the landing for the defunct Boones Ferry.

The Wilsonville Community Center holds classes and community programs as well as community meeting space. Wilsonville holds an annual arts fair each May called the Wilsonville Festival of Arts. Another annual event, Wilsonville Celebration Days, started in 2000 and replaced Boones Ferry Days. A farmers' market started in 2009 at the Villebois development, held on Thursdays from May into October. Charbonneau Golf Club is the only golf course in the city, with Langdon Farms and Sandelie just to the south and east respectively. Wilsonville also is along the Willamette Greenway series of open spaces and trails. Wilsonville is the setting for the 2008 film Wendy and Lucy.

Government

Wilsonville has a home rule charter and is a council-manager governed municipality where the unelected city manager runs day-to-day operations. The current city manager is Bryan Cosgrove. The mayor and four-person city council are elected to four-year terms. , Wilsonville's elected officials are Julie Fitzgerald (Mayor), Kristin Akervall (Council President), Joann Linville, Caroline Berry and Katie Dunwell.

Fire protection and police protection are contracted to other area governmental agencies. Fire services are provided by Tualatin Valley Fire & Rescue, and that agency operates two fire stations in the city. Police service is contracted out to the Clackamas County Sheriff's Office, with a captain serving as the chief of police and officers using vehicles marked as Wilsonville Police.

Wilsonville also provides its own water supply and wastewater treatment. The wastewater system was built in 1972, while the water system was upgraded with a new treatment plant in 2002. Water is drawn from the Willamette River from the Wilsonville Water Treatment Plant built at a cost of $46 million in conjunction with the Tualatin Valley Water District. The city used to use wells to provide drinking water, but those began to run dry in the late 1990s. The plant's initial capacity was 15 million gallons per day, but can be expanded to 120 million gallons per day. Neighboring Sherwood will begin receiving water from the plant in 2012.

The city has a single library branch, a  building on Wilsonville Road. The majority of the city is within the West Linn-Wilsonville School District, but the Charbonneau area is part of the Canby School District. Public transit is provided by the city through SMART, though TriMet has connections via buses at the northern limits of the city and with the Westside Express Service commuter rail.

At the federal level, Wilsonville lies within Oregon's 6th congressional district, represented by Lori Chavez-DeRemer. In the State Senate, the city is in District 13, represented by Aaron Woods. In the House, the city is represented by Courtney Neron in House District 26. In addition, Wilsonville lies within District 3 (represented by Gerritt Rosenthal) of the Metro regional government.

Education

Most of Wilsonville is in the West Linn-Wilsonville School District (WLWSD), however those portions south of the Willamette River are within the Canby School District. Areas just to the west lie within the Sherwood School District. Lowrie Primary, Boeckman Creek and Boones Ferry primary schools serve K-5 students from Wilsonville in WLWSD. Students in grades 6–8 attend Inza R. Wood Middle School and Meridian Creek Middle School, and high school students attend Wilsonville High School or the Arts and Technology High School (ArtTech). Neither the Canby or Sherwood districts operate schools within Wilsonville.

The city is also in the Clackamas Community College District and has a satellite campus on Town Center Loop. Opened in 1992, the campus was originally known as the Oregon Advanced Technology Center. The private, for-profit Pioneer Pacific College operates their main campus in the city, along Interstate 5 near the Boeckman Road overpass.

Boeckman Creek Primary School opened in 1995 and has 649 students, with a mascot of the Bobcats. Boones Ferry replaced the old Wilsonville Primary School in 2000; its 809 students make it the largest primary school in the district,  and are known as the Dragonflies. Wood Middle School opened in 1986 and has 699 students, known as the Wolverines. Meridian Creek Middle School opened in 2016 and are known as the mustangs. Wilsonville High School has been the home of the Wildcats since the 1,002-student school opened in 1999. The ArtTech charter high school has 88 students and opened in 2001.

Transportation

Interstate 5 runs north-south through the middle of the city and crosses the Willamette River on the Boone Bridge. Wilsonville has two interchanges with the freeway north of the river, at Wilsonville Road on the south and where Boones Ferry Road meets Elligsen Road on the north end of town. To the south of the river, the Charbonneau interchange crosses I-5 at the southern limit of the city. Boeckman Road is the only other street that crosses I-5 and links the western and eastern parts of Wilsonville. Wilsonville Road, 95th Avenue, Boones Ferry Road (northern portion is Oregon Route 141), Boeckman Road, Town Center Loop, French Prairie Drive, Elligsen Road, Parkway Avenue, and Stafford Road are the main roads in the city.

Transit service used to provide by TriMet, but the city decided to "opt-out" and now operates South Metro Area Regional Transit (SMART). SMART has connections with Salem's transit service, Canby's transit service, and TriMet. The Westside Express Service (WES), a commuter rail line to Beaverton, began operations in February 2009. Wilsonville Station is the southern terminus of the nearly  line operated by TriMet, and the station is the hub for SMART services.

Freight rail service is provided by the Portland and Western Railroad over the same tracks as WES, with connections to BNSF Railway. These tracks run north-south and cross the Willamette over the Portland and Western Railroad Bridge. The city does not have an airport, with Aurora State Airport to the south as the closest public field and Portland International Airport 17 miles north as the closest commercial airport. Although located along the river, there are not any port facilities, though there is a marina located on the east bank (south side) of the Willamette.

Notable people

The city has been home to a variety of notable people ranging from politicians to athletes and authors. Famous politicians to call Wilsonville home include former governor George Law Curry, Congresswoman Edith Green, federal judge James M. Burns, and former mayor and state representative Jerry Krummel. Athletes of note have included football player Derek Devine, professional golfer Brian Henninger, and baseball player and manager Del Baker. Those prominent in the legal field are Gordon Sloan, and R. William Riggs. Others include children's author Walt Morey, businessman Tom Bruggere, baseball coach Mel Krause, actor Frank Cady, and Greg Eklund, drummer for multi platinum recording artist Everclear.

Actor Henry Thomas is a current resident. He starred as Elliot in the movie ET, 1982.

Sister city
Wilsonville has one sister city relationship. The city established a relationship with Kitakata, in the Fukushima province of Japan in 1988. Kitakata in the northern part of Honshū has an estimated population of around 55,000. Then-Wilsonville Mayor Jerry Krummel visited Japan in 1994 to attend a ceremony honoring Kitakata's 40th birthday. The mayor of Kitakata visited Wilsonville in 2008 to celebrate the twentieth anniversary of the relationship.

See also

List of ghost towns in Oregon – Boones Ferry was a ghost town subsumed by Wilsonville

References

External links

Official website
Official Visitor Website
Entry for Wilsonville in the Oregon Blue Book
Wilsonville Chamber of Commerce
Historic images of Wilsonville from Salem Public Library

 
Cities in Oregon
Cities in Clackamas County, Oregon
Cities in Washington County, Oregon
Portland metropolitan area
Populated places established in 1969
1969 establishments in Oregon
Populated places on the Willamette River